Giovanni Alessandro Brambilla, Baron of Carpiano (15 April 1728 – 30 July 1800 in Padua) was a personal physician of Holy Roman Emperor Joseph II and the first director of the Josephinian Military Academy of Surgery in Vienna.

Brambilla was born in San Zenone al Po near Pavia, and studied at the University of Pavia. After five years of internship at San Matteo Hospital, he joined in the Austrian army as assistant surgeon. He rose in the ranks, and by 1779, was sole supervisor of the Austrian military health system, Imperial Protosurgeon under Joseph II, Knight of the Holy Roman Empire, Aulic Counsel. His service to the emperor granted him a feudal title as lord of Carpiano.

In 1758, he founded the Medical-Surgical Academy of Vienna (better known as the Josephinium). He helped recruit Antonio Scarpa to the chair of Anatomy at the University of Pavia. After the death of Joseph II, Brambilla returned to Pavia in 1795, after the death of Joseph II, and here he lived there the remainder of his life. After the Napoleonic victory of Marengo, Brambilla was travelling back to Vienna when he passed away.

References

1728 births
1800 deaths
Physicians from Pavia
18th-century Italian physicians
Italian surgeons
18th-century Austrian physicians
University of Pavia alumni